Patikas is a surname. Notable people with the surname include: 

Iraklis Patikas (1870s–?), Greek chieftain of the Macedonian Struggle 
Jim Patikas (born 1963), Australian football player
Louiza Patikas (born 1976/1977), British actress